Hpapun Township (MLCTS: hpa.pwan.mrui.nay; ; ; also known by the Karen people as Mutraw or Bu Tho Township) is a township of Hpapun District in the Karen State of Myanmar. It lies on the border of Thailand across the Salween River. The central part of the township is bounded on the west by the Yunzalin River. Hpapun Township's administrative center is Papun.

References
"Forced Relocation Sites in Papun (Mu Traw) District, Karen State, Map by CIDKP Dec. 2000" in "13. Internally Displaced People and Forced Relocation" Facts on Human Rights Violation in Burma: 2002-2003, Online Burma/Myanmar Library

Townships of Kayin State